Massimiliano "Max" Menetti (born 27 January 1973) is an Italian professional basketball coach, who was most recently the head coach of Italian team Pallacanestro Reggiana .

Career
After spending years coaching the youth teams of Pallacanestro Reggiana and serving as assistant coach, Menetti was offered the head coach role for the 2006–07 season though he returned to the assistant role at the end of the season.
After a stint at Sutor Montegranaro in 2009–10 (again as an assistant), he returned to Reggio Emilia.
One year later he would be named head coach again, a position he would make his for the subsequent seasons.
In 2014 he led Pallacanestro Reggiana to the EuroChallenge title.

On 1 July 2015, his contract was extended until 2017.
On 16 May 2018, Menetti and Pallacanestro Reggiana consensually parted ways, with one year of contract still left. Menetti left the club after 8 seasons as head coach since the 2011 takeover, winning promotion to Serie A in 2012, five consecutive Playoffs and Final Eight participation (2012–2017), one EuroChallenge (2014), one Italian Supercup (2015) and finishing two times as Serie A runners-up (2015, 2016) and reaching the EuroCup semifinals (2018).

From summer of 2018 Menetti is the head coach of Universo Treviso Basket. During the first season with Menneti at the helm, Treviso went on to win Serie A2 Basket play-off championship and got place in Serie A.

Personal
He is married with former Argentinian volleyball player Maria Pia Romanò, with whom he has a daughter. 
Romanò played for various seasons in Reggio Emilia, while Menetti was club assistant.

References

External links
Serie A profile  Retrieved 2 September 2015

1973 births
Living people
Italian basketball coaches
Pallacanestro Reggiana coaches